Jezerca Peak is the highest peak in the Dinaric Alps, the fifth highest in Albania and the sixth highest in the Balkans, standing at  above sea level. It is the 28th most prominent mountain peak in Europe, and is regarded as one of the toughest and most dangerous climbs in the Albanian Alps.

Maja Jezercë is situated within the Accursed Mountains range, which is noted for several small glaciers - among the southernmost glacial masses in Europe after Snezhnika glacier (latitude of 41°46′09″ N) and Banski Suhodol Glacier in Pirin mountain in Bulgaria. Apart from certain areas north of the peak, the limestone mountain massif is part of the National Parks of Theth and Valbonë Valley. It can be climbed from the north; most climbers come from Gusinje in Montenegro as well as from Theth.

In part, the whole floor between the valley of Valbonë, Shala, Ropojana and Maja Roshit  is known as Jezercë, in addition to the peak, Jezercës borders other peaks such as the Maja e Popljuces and the Maja e Alisë  in the west, Maja Rrogamit  to the east, Maja Kolajet , Maja Malësores , Maja Bojs  in the northwest,
Maja Kokervhake  and Maja Etheve  in the north.

Name 
Having been invaded by Serbs from the Ottomans in 1913 and annexed by the Kingdom of Serbia prior to the Treaty of London and the creation of the first Albanian state in that same year, the name of the Mountain means Fogg in Albanian". Jezerski Vrh means "lake peak". The toponym refers to the cirque lakes in the lower part of the Buni i Jezercës on the northern side of the mountain.  During the Titoist era it was given the name of Maja e Rinisë (Mountain of Youth), which never stuck.

Topology 

Jezerca is a large rocky peak of dolomitic limestone. There is almost no vegetation there. North, east and west of the mountain top is in great cirque from that in the glacial periods when glaciers were more extensive than today.

Gallery

See also  
 Geography of Albania
 List of non-Alpine European Ultras

References

External links 
 archived page from SummitPost.org
 Bericht von einer Ersteigung mit hilfreichen Informationen
Balkan Natural Adventure

Mountains of Albania
Accursed Mountains
Two-thousanders of Albania
Valbonë Valley National Park